Molotov is an EP by The Bruisers. It was released on Cyclone Records in 1998. It was the last release before the band broke up.

Song list
 "These Two Boots of Mine"
 "Six of Them"
 "Molotov"
 "Nomad"
 "Intimidation '97"

Personnel
 Al Barr – vocals
 Keith "Ritchie" Richards guitar
 Scott Vierra – guitar
 Johnny Rioux – bass
 John Dicicco – drums

The Bruisers albums
Cyclone Records albums
1998 EPs